WHSG-TV (channel 63) is a religious television station licensed to Monroe, Georgia, United States, serving the Atlanta area as an owned-and-operated station of the Trinity Broadcasting Network (TBN). The station's studios are located on Agape Way in Decatur, and its transmitter is located in Atlanta's Cabbagetown section.

Because it airs no local content (except for local insertion of the required station identification), it is not carried as a local channel on DirecTV; the network's national feed is already available, but TBN's subchannel sister networks are not available.

It had one broadcast translator, W55BM, licensed to Marietta with transmitter atop Sweat Mountain, northwest of Atlanta. That station was later W49DE and WXID-LP, an affiliate of JCTV.

History

The station launched on March 15, 1991. As the call sign indicates, it initially served as an affiliate of the Home Shopping Network, replacing WNGM (now WUVG-DT). Later, TBN bought the station and changed to the current religious format.

Technical information

Subchannels

Analog-to-digital transition
WHSG-TV shut down its analog signal, over UHF channel 63, on April 16, 2009. The station's digital signal remained on its pre-transition UHF channel 44, using PSIP to display WHSG-TV's virtual channel as 63 on digital television receivers, which was among the high band UHF channels (52-69) that were removed from broadcasting use as a result of the transition.

The station's analog transmitter was located in northern Rockdale County, halfway between Monroe and Atlanta. The station's digital facility is immediately south of Atlanta's Inman Park neighborhood, along the north side of Interstate 20. This is the same tower used by WUPA (channel 69), built by that station when its original location (atop the Westin Peachtree Plaza hotel) could not hold a second large TV antenna for digital, although WUPA has since moved to the North Druid Hills site, sharing an antenna through a diplexer. It also has WIRE-CD (channel 40), an expired construction permit for W06CM-D (channel 6), and a license for WYGA-CD on channel 16 (as well as a permit for 18 and a later app for 16 again). No serious damage occurred to the tower when the 2008 Atlanta tornado passed by the site, even though the then-analog WYGA-CA 45 (operating from the site under STA at very low power until WGCL-TV (channel 46) went digital) was knocked off-air. WHSG had an application to increase from 700 kW to its maximum 1,000 kW effective radiated power with the same antenna height, which is now licensed at the new site.

References

External links

FCC coverage map for WHSG-TV

HSG-TV
Trinity Broadcasting Network affiliates
Television channels and stations established in 1991
1991 establishments in Georgia (U.S. state)
Walton County, Georgia